KCVR-FM (98.9 MHz) is a radio station licensed to Columbia, California, and broadcasting to the Central Valley cities of Modesto and Stockton, in addition to the Sierra Nevada foothills surrounding Columbia, where the transmitter site is located. The station is owned by Entravision Communications.

History

Early Years
In the early 1990s, a construction permit was issued for a new station at 98.9 FM, to be licensed to cover the Sierra Nevada town of Columbia. The station was assigned the call letters KAGF on December 17, 1993, only to change to KTDO on September 30, 1994. Program testing began in 1995. After receiving its broadcast license on August 30, 1996, KTDO officially signed on with a power rating of 6000 watts, primarily in the direction of Modesto. The station's callsign was changed to KTDZ, on March 10, 2000.

Acquisition by Entravision
In late 2001, the station was acquired by Entravision Communications, then a startup company from Santa Monica. After the sale closed, KTDZ flipped to a rock en español format branded as Super Estrella. On December 17, 2001, the station's callsign became the current KCVR-FM.

Adoption of KTSE simulcast

On January 8, 2018, KCVR-FM adopted a simulcast of KTSE-FM, and its Spanish-language Soft AC format, branded as La Suavecita This simulcast would only last 14 months.

Country era

In March 2019, KCVR-FM broke its simulcast with KTSE and flipped to Country, branded as "98.9 The Wolf", adopting the branding found on Shingle Springs station KNTY. KCVR-FM would use KNTY's airstaff during this time to voicetrack in key dayparts, while still airing local advertisements and weather reports. This move transitioned KCVR-FM to an English-language outlet for the first time since Entravision's 2001 acquisition of the station.

Adoption of KHHM simulcast
Unfortunately, on July 2, 2019, staffers at KCVR, concurrent with KNTY, and Sacramento rhythmic station KHHM, informed listeners via Instagram that they have been let go as all three stations will flip formats. On July 8, 2019, KNTY flipped to Regional Mexican as a simulcast with KRCX in Marysville, while KCVR and KHHM remained jockless ahead of their impending format flips to be determined. The move ended a 13 year run of the Wolf brand, and short four-month run for KCVR-FM as "98.9 The Wolf", as KCVR-FM would adopt a full time simulcast of KHHM and its Fuego FM branding and Rhythmic CHR format, with a bilingual presentation on July 29, 2019. The move makes KCVR-FM a competitor to Rhythmic CHR station KWIN. Despite the bilingual shift in music, all programs and sonic imaging are still presented in English.

References

External links

CVR-FM
Entravision Communications stations
Contemporary hit radio stations in the United States